Saif Rashid (Arabic:سيف راشد) (born 10 August 1991) is an Emirati footballer. He currently plays as a goalkeeper.

External links

References

Emirati footballers
1991 births
Living people
Al Ain FC players
Al-Wasl F.C. players
Al Jazira Club players
Al-Ittihad Kalba SC players
Hatta Club players
Masfout Club players
UAE First Division League players
UAE Pro League players
Association football goalkeepers